Teen Ta Tseang Keun or Tëen ta tsëang keun meaning "Heaven's Great General", was a Chinese constellation  in the region of Lóu. It contained stars of the western constellations Andromeda and Triangulum. Allen based identification of Chinese star names by the English astronomer John Williams (1797–1874) and the naturalist  John Reeves. But Allen lacked last word kuen as Tien Ta Tseang and also transliterated it as Tsien Ta Tseang.

Identification of stars

 Notes
＊ 54 And is designated as φ Per in recent times.

Notes

References
 
 大崎正次 (1987): 「中国の星座・星名の同定一覧表」『中国の星座の歴史』 雄山閣出版, p. 326.
 陳久金 (2005): 『中國星座神話』 台灣書房出版有限公司. .

Chinese constellations